Milonja Đukić (born 12 December 1965) is a retired Montenegrin-born Serbian footballer.

Club career
He spent part of his career at FK Partizan playing in the Yugoslav First League. He also played for NK Olimpija Ljubljana. In 1990, he moved to Turkey to play for Trabzonspor in the Super Lig. He later spent seven seasons with S.C. Farense in the Portuguese Liga. With FK Partizan he won national Championship (1986) and national Cup (1989).

References

External links
 
 
 

1965 births
Living people
People from Berane
Serbs of Montenegro
Serbian footballers
Yugoslav footballers
Association football forwards
FK Partizan players
FK Vojvodina players
FK Sutjeska Nikšić players
NK Olimpija Ljubljana (1945–2005) players
Trabzonspor footballers
S.C. Farense players
Yugoslav First League players
Süper Lig players
Primeira Liga players
Serbian expatriate footballers
Expatriate footballers in Turkey
Expatriate footballers in Portugal